Mortar may refer to:
 Mortar (weapon), an indirect-fire infantry weapon
 Mortar (masonry), a material used to fill the gaps between blocks and bind them together
 Mortar and pestle, a tool pair used to crush or grind
 Mortar, Bihar, a village in India
 Mortar (organization), a nonprofit in Cincinnati, Ohio
 The Manby mortar, an invention for rescuing shipwreck survivors

See also 
 Mortar methods, discretization methods for partial differential equations
 Mortarboard, a type of headwear worn as part of academic dress
 Mortar Board, a national honor society for college seniors